Tridacna mbalavuana, the tevoro clam,  is a species of bivalve in the family Cardiidae. It is found in Fiji and Tonga. It is currently listed on the IUCN Red List of Threatened Species.

References

mbalavuana
Molluscs of the Pacific Ocean
Molluscs described in 1934
Taxonomy articles created by Polbot